Astrothelium lucidomedullatum is a species of corticolous (bark-dwelling), crustose lichen in the family Trypetheliaceae. Found in Ecuador, it was formally described as a new species in 2016 by Dutch lichenologist André Aptroot. The medulla contains lichexanthone, a lichen product that causes its tissue to fluoresce when lit with a long-wavelength UV light. The main characteristics of the lichen distinguishing it from others in Astrothelium are its ascospores, which number four per ascus and have dimensions of 80–115 by 25–35 μm; the presence of lichexanthone in the medulla; and the structure of the  ascomata, which have separate ostioles and are covered by the thallus.

References

lucidomedullatum
Lichen species
Lichens described in 2016
Lichens of Ecuador
Taxa named by André Aptroot